Crash Course is an Indian Hindi-language Drama web series written by Manish Hariprasad and Raina Roy, directed by Vijay Maurya and produced by Owlet Films. Starring Annu Kapoor, Udit Arora, Anvesha Vij, Anushka Kaushik, Bhanu Uday, Hetal Gada, Hridhu Haroon, Pranay Pachauri and others, the web series was released on Amazon Prime Video on 5 August 2022.

Plot 
The series follows a group of students who, in the midst of preparations for competitive exams to fulfil their parent's expectations, are affected when two rival coaching institutes of Kota (Rajasthan) – the Ratanraj Jindal and Arvind Batra-led centres engage in a power struggle.

Cast 
 Annu Kapoor as Ratanraj Jindal
 Siddharth Kak as Arvind Batra
 Bhanu Uday as Shashank Batra
 Chirag Vohra as Mayank Batra
 Bidita Bag as Antara Jaiswal
 Hetal Gada as Tejal Patel
 Riddhi Kumar as Shanaya Qazi
 Deepak Dutta as Home Minister
 Udit Arora as Binny Agarwal
 Pranay Pachauri as Ashutosh Kumar/AK
 Anushka Kaushik as Vidhi Gupta
 Hridhu Haroon as Sathya Srinivasan
 Mohit Solanki as Anil Baid
 Bhavesh Balchandani as Aviral Bharti
 Aryan Singh as Rakesh Gulia
 Anvesha Vij as Nikki Kapoor
 Gaurav Sharma as Dheeraj Khandelwal/KD
 Vasuki as Vidya Nair
 Devas Dixit as Mahender

Episodes

Release 
Crash Course was released on Amazon Prime Video in India and worldwide on August 5, 2022.

Reception 
Most of the critics found Crash Course as a spin-off version of Netflix series Kota Factory. Archika Khurana for The Times of India rate 3/5 stars and wrote "'Crash Course' has nothing new to offer in terms of insights. One thing that remains constant throughout the show, if not more, is that you will miss Kota Factory's Jeetu Bhaiya and his words of wisdom..." Prateek Sur for Outlook rated 2.5/5 stars and wrote "'Crash Course’ is a hard-hitting and realistic view of today's education system. Its heart is in the right place, however, it’s the sloppy writing that kills the fun." Ruchi Kaushal for Hindustan Times wrote "Crash Course stands far from Kota Factory in realism but does take credit for addressing student suicides, parental pressure, the distractions they face away from home, love angles, teenage pregnancy and even drugs." Deepa Gehlot for Scroll.in wrote "There was nothing new to add to the narrative of avaricious coaching classes, pushy parents and vulnerable students. Thus the Amazon Prime Video series Crash Course, directed by actor-writer Vijay Maurya from a script by Manish Hariprasad and Raina Roy, treads familiar ground." Pratikshya Mishra for The Quint wrote "Unlike Kota Factory, the show is more gripping when it’s focusing on the business and the politics of education, especially living through Udit Arora as Binny, the ‘real kingpin’ of Kota". Namrata Thakker for Rediff.com wrote "The series has 10 episodes with a runtime of 50-odd minutes per episode, and that's too much. The makers could have squeezed the story in seven or eight episodes, making it crisper." The Pinkvilla focused some light on the web series as Netflix web series Kota Factory and wrote "All in all, Crash Course is a distant relative of Kota Factory, which builds some tension in the first episode but lacks the novelty due to an already iconic series in the same space." Shubham Kulkarni for Koimoi wrote, "Written by Hariprasad and Raina Roy the show shifts its focus from the students to the mess behind the scene and how they only become the collateral damage of this mad roller coaster of a city."

References

External links 

 

2022 web series debuts
Hindi-language web series
Amazon Prime Video original programming